Daniel Blue may refer to:
 Daniel Blue (church administrator) (1796–1884), founder of the Saint Andrews African Methodist Episcopal Church in Sacramento, California
 Daniel T. Blue, Jr. (born 1949), Democratic Representative for North Carolina
 Danny Blue (comedian) (born 1949), British comedian
 Danny Blue (Hustle), fictional character from TV series Hustle